Wawro is a surname. Notable people with the surname include:

Geoffrey Wawro (born 1960), American military historian
Richard Wawro (1952–2006), Scottish artist